Bangladeshi cuisine refers to the food and culinary traditions prevalent in Bangladesh. Dating far in the past, the cuisine emphasizes fish, vegetables and lentils served with rice. Because of differences in history and Bangladeshi geography, the cuisine is rich in regional variations. While having unique traits, Bangladeshi cuisine is closely related to that of surrounding Bengali and North-East Indian, with rice and fish as traditional favorites. Bangladesh also developed the only multi-course tradition in South Asia. It is known as Bangaliketa styled cuisine. Bangladeshi food is served by course rather than all at once.

Bangladeshi dishes

Vegetables Items

Rice Items

Fish Items

Meat Items

Lentils/dal and Stew

Drinks

Pitha

Sweet & Dessert

Snacks and Street food

See also

 Bengali cuisine
 Culture of Bangladesh
 List of cuisines

References

Lists of foods by nationality
Dishes